Meuleman is a Dutch surname meaning "mill man". It originally could have referred to a miller or to someone who lived near a wind or water mill. Among variant forms are Meulemans, Meulman(s) and Moleman(s). People with this name include:

August Meuleman (1906–2000), Belgian racing cyclist
Brice Meuleman (1862–1924), Belgian Jesuit missionary in British India and Archbishop of Calcutta 1902–24
 (born 1975), Belgian Green Party politician
Jack Meuleman (1894–1964), Australian rules footballer
Ken Meuleman (1923–2004), Australian cricketer, son of Jack
 (1934–1998), Belgian racing cyclist
Robert Meuleman (born 1949), Australian cricketer, son of Ken
Scott Meuleman (born 1980), Australian cricketer, son of Scott
Meulemans
Arthur Meulemans (1884–1966), Belgian composer, conductor, and music teacher
Jeannine Meulemans (born 1951), Belgian judoka
Karel Meulemans (born 1934), Belgian pigeon fancier
Meulman
Jacqueline Meulman (b. 1954), Dutch psychologist
Niels Shoe Meulman (b. 1967), Dutch visual artist, graffiti writer, graphic designer and art director
Moleman(s)
 (1938–1994), Belgian historian, toponymist, and dialectologist
 (born 1948), Dutch pharmacologist

See also 
Hans Moleman, recurring character in the animated television series The Simpsons

References

Dutch-language surnames
Occupational surnames
Toponymic surnames